The Tiffany Chapel is a chapel interior designed by Louis Comfort Tiffany and created by the Tiffany Glass and Decorating Company. First installed for the 1893 World's Columbian Exposition in Chicago, the chapel was later moved to the Cathedral of St. John the Divine in New York City, then re-acquired by Tiffany in 1916 and displayed in his own home. After the chapel was dismantled in 1949, parts were sold and the remaining portions were put on display at the Charles Hosmer Morse Museum of American Art in Winter Park, Florida in April 1999.

Description
Created in a Byzantine-Romanesque style, the Tiffany chapel consists of complementing interior elements that include a marble and white glass altar in front of six carved arches each supported by two double columns all on an elevated mosaic platform. A cross stands on the altar between two pairs of candles. The reredos displays a pair of peacocks - symbols of eternal life - under a crown in a Favrile glass mosaic. On the left front is the ambo flanked by two candlesticks. Off to the right is the baptistry its front bordered by four columns and its back showing the large colored glass "Field of Lilies" window repeating the columnar pattern. The globe-shaped baptismal font is sitting on a hexagonal columned base in the center of the baptistry. From the ceiling of the chapel hangs an electrified ten by eight foot emerald glass chandelier in the shape of a cross. Windows in the chapel show Tiffany glasswork built on the mosaic system displaying Christian themes including Christ Blessing the Evangelists and The Story of the Cross. Furnishings include wooden benches. In the museum, the chapel occupies an  area.

History
In 1893 the then- chapel was installed as a showpiece in the Manufacturers and Liberal Arts Building at the 1893 Exposition. Tiffany reportedly said that "his was a chapel in which to worship art." Visited by 1.4 million people it was greatly admired, brought international attention to Tiffany, and won 54 awards.

After the fair, it was disassembled and placed in storage. In 1898, Celia Whipple Wallace (1833-1916) purchased the chapel for $50,000 for it to be installed in the Cathedral of St. John the Divine, then under construction in Manhattan. It was installed in the basement crypt with the intent to be placed in the main church. However, when Ralph Adams Cram took over as architect, the style of the cathedral was changed to "gothic" and the Tiffany chapel stayed in the basement. It was in ecclesiastical use for about twelve years (1899–1911)—the only time it served as a chapel—then abandoned when the choir above was completed, and fell into disrepair.  After 1916, Tiffany reacquired it, made repairs and replacements where necessary, and installed the work in its own building on his Long Island estate, Laurelton Hall. After his death in 1933, the estate changed. The Tiffany Foundation dismantled the chapel in 1949 and sold some pieces.

After a fire in 1957 that had destroyed the main building, the remnants of the chapel were in disrepair. They were headed for destruction when Jeannette G. and Hugh F. McKean came to Laurelton Hall to recover its windows and architectural elements for the Morse Museum in Winter Park. They tracked other parts of the chapel that had been sold and repurchased them, so that the elements of the chapel could be reunited. After an extensive renovation the restored Tiffany Chapel became accessible to the public in 1999. Most of the items are original including the windows, columns, arches, decorative moldings, the altar floor, as well as most furnishings. Non-original parts such as the walls, ceilings, and the floor of the nave are redesigned following descriptions of the installation at Laurelton Hall.

See also
Willard Memorial Chapel
Wade Chapel

References
Notes

External links
Tiffany Chapel at Morse Museum

Art museums and galleries in Florida
Museums in Orange County, Florida
Buildings and structures in Winter Park, Florida
Art Nouveau architecture in Chicago
Glass works of art
World's Columbian Exposition
Art Nouveau church buildings in the United States
World's fair architecture in Chicago
World's fair architecture in the United States
Tiffany Studios